The Fernandes Group is a Surinamese holding company. The holding company is active in the wood industry, soft drinks, bakery and soap. Its soft drinks are being bottled in the Netherlands as well.

Origins
Fernandes was founded in 1939 by Surinamese-Jewish Isaak Fernandes and his son Jule Fernandes. Originally, the company had only shares in the wood industry and the production of soap. Through the operation of Isaak Fernandes, the company was able to expand to a bakery. Growth increased sharply when the Fernandes Group managed to acquire the bottle rights of Coca-Cola in the 1930s exclusively for Suriname. The company's activities were further expanded under the guidance of Jule Fernandes, the son of Isaak. Thanks to him, Fernandes expanded into a brand in Suriname, which makes many different products.

Current era
After the death of Jule Fernandes, Rene and Jack Fernandes took over the company in 1988. Under their leadership, Fernandes became one of the leading holding companies in Suriname. Rene and Jack Fernandes are both in the board now. Today, in Fernandes there are several Fernandes soft drinks in Suriname.

Logo
In the Netherlands and Suriname, the soft drinks of Fernandes are released by Lachmansingh Beverage Wholesale. It introduced a logo with palm trees for the Dutch market, designed to emphasize the tropical character of Fernandes soft drinks.

Products

Soda
Fernandes currently has nine flavors of soda on the market:
Cherry Bouquet
Green Punch
Super Pineapple
Red Grape
Pink Melon
Sparkling Coco
Purple Sensation
Cream Ginger
Guaraná

References

External links
Official Website of Fernandes Bottling Company and Fernandes Sales Company (in Dutch)

Holding companies of Suriname
Holding companies established in 1918
1918 establishments in Suriname
Coca-Cola bottlers
Companies of Suriname